Choqa Zard (also Romanized as Choqā Zard) is a small village in Mahidasht Rural District, Mahidasht District, Kermanshah County, Kermanshah Province, Iran. As of the 2006 census, its population was 296 in a total of 68 different families.

References 

Populated places in Kermanshah County